Ailín Salas (born July 14, 1993) is an Argentine actress.

Filmography

Movies

Television

Awards and nominations

References

External access 
 Ailin Salas at Cinenacional .
 
 Ailin Salas on Facebook

Argentine film actresses
1993 births
Living people
People from Aracaju
Brazilian emigrants to Argentina